During the 2005–06 Spanish football season, Valencia CF competed in La Liga.

Season summary
Valencia opened a new chapter in its history with the appointment of Spanish high-rated coach Quique Sánchez Flores, who had been successful managing Getafe. The most significant player during the season was new striker David Villa, signed from Real Zaragoza in the summer, who netted 25 goals over the full season but losing the topscoring battle of La Liga to Barcelona's Samuel Eto'o with 26 strikes, which was a near low-record. Valencia ended a league season finished 3rd place, just a single point behind Real Madrid and secured UEFA Champions League third qualifying round in the following season. To make matters worse, Valencia had endured a worst UEFA Intertoto Cup run, being beaten 1–0 later eliminated in the final UEFA Intertoto Cup by German club Hamburg and thus failed to qualify for UEFA Cup. This was only their earliest exit from European competitions for the first time.

Most notable new players also include Dutch veteran Patrick Kluivert, Spanish young defence starlet Raúl Albiol, Brazilian Edu and Juan Mora.

First-team squad
Squad at end of season

Left club during season

Results

La Liga

Copa del Rey

Quarter-final

Intertoto Cup

Third round

Valencia won 2–0 on aggregate.

Semi-final

Valencia won 4–0 on aggregate.

Final

Hamburg won 1–0 on aggregate.

References

Notes

Valencia CF seasons
Valencia CF